Jon Ergüín Bolibar (born 3 March 1980) is a retired Spanish slalom canoeist who competed at the international level from 1997 to 2016.

He won a bronze medal in the C1 team event at the 2009 ICF Canoe Slalom World Championships in La Seu d'Urgell and also at the 2000 European Championships in Mezzana. Ergüín finished 16th in the C1 event at the 2000 Summer Olympics in Sydney.

References

External links

 12 September 2009 final results of the men's C1 team slalom event for the 2009 ICF Canoe Slalom World Championships. - accessed 12 September 2009.

1980 births
Canoeists at the 2000 Summer Olympics
Living people
Olympic canoeists of Spain
Spanish male canoeists
Sportspeople from San Sebastián
Medalists at the ICF Canoe Slalom World Championships
Canoeists from the Basque Country (autonomous community)